The Kingdom of Satahun was a petty kingdom in the confederation of 24 states known as Chaubisi Rajya.

References 

Chaubisi Rajya
Former countries in South Asia
Satahun
History of Nepal
S